Knud Christian Andersen (29 April 1867 in Frederiksberg – last seen alive June 1918 in England) was a Danish zoologist. His research focused on bats.

Life and work
Towards the end of the 19th century, Andersen first worked as an ornithologist and ran field studies on the Faroe Islands. In 1901 Ferdinand I awarded him an appointment at the Zoological Museum of Sofia. Due to his frustration with the working conditions, he gave up this position. In 1904, he was hired by the British Museum to research bats in the Pacific, in South-East Asia and in Queensland. He was especially interested in the genus Flying Fox and Horseshoe bats, of which he described 15 new species. He published 13 scientific papers on the South-East Asian Horseshoe bats. His most famous work was his Catalogue of the Chiroptera in the Collection of the British Museum, which is considered one of the most extensive works on flying foxes. Andersen was elected fellow of the Zoological Society of London (ZSL) in 1909.

In June 1918 he mysteriously disappeared; his body has never been found. His colleague Oldfield Thomas submitted his final manuscript on his behalf and stated that Andersen expected "to be absent from his scientific work for some time."

Dedicated taxa
Rhinolophus anderseni (1909 by Ángel Cabrera; no longer a valid taxon, the subspecies anderseni and aequalis are today considered synonyms of the species Rhinolophus arcuatus and Rhinolophus acuminatus). 
Dobsonia anderseni (1914 by Oldfield Thomas), Artibeus anderseni (1916 by Wilfred Hudson Osgood).

See also
List of people who disappeared

Selected publications
Meddelelser om faeroernes Fugle med saerligt Hensyn til Nolsø, efter skriftlige Oplysninger (with P.F. Petersen), 1894
Diomedea melanophrys, boende paa Færøerne, 1894 (English: Diomedea melanophrys in the Faröe Islands, 1895)
Sysselmand H.C. Müller’s haandskrevne optegnelser om Færøoerne Fugle (with Hans Christopher Müller), 1901
 

On the determination of age in bats, 1917

Species described by Knud Andersen
 Acerodon humilis K. Andersen 1909
 Dobsonia praedatrix K. Andersen 1909
 Dobsonia inermis K. Andersen 1909
 Dobsonia exoleta K. Andersen 1909
 Eonycteris major K. Andersen 1910
 Pteropus cognatus K. Andersen 1908
 Pteropus intermedius K. Andersen 1908
 Pteropus lylei K. Andersen 1908
 Pteropus speciosus K. Andersen 1908
 Pteropus pelewensis K. Andersen 1908
 Pteropus pilosus K. Andersen 1908
 Pteropus yapensis K. Andersen 1908
 Rousettus celebensis K. Andersen 1907
 Macroglossus sobrinus K. Andersen 1911
 Nyctimene minutus K. Andersen 1910
 Nyctimene cyclotis K. Andersen 1910
 Nyctimene certans K. Andersen 1912
 Pteralopex anceps K. Andersen 1909
 Rhinolophus nereis K. Andersen 1905
 Rhinolophus monoceros K. Andersen 1905
 Rhinolophus madurensis K. Andersen 1918
 Rhinolophus simulator K. Andersen 1904
 Rhinolophus virgo K. Andersen 1905
 Rhinolophus thomasi K. Andersen 1905
 Rhinolophus subrufus K. Andersen 1905
 Rhinolophus sinicus K. Andersen 1905
 Rhinolophus robinsoni K. Andersen 1918
 Rhinolophus shortridgei K. Andersen 1918
 Rhinolophus sedulus K. Andersen 1905
 Rhinolophus stheno K. Andersen 1905
 Rhinolophus inops K. Andersen 1905
 Rhinolophus celebensis K. Andersen 1905
 Rhinolophus cognatus K. Andersen 1906
 Rhinolophus eloquens K. Andersen 1905
 Rhinolophus darlingi K. Andersen 1905
 Hipposideros nequam K. Andersen 1918
 Hipposideros pomona K. Andersen 1918
 Hipposideros beatus K. Andersen 1906
 Hipposideros dinops K. Andersen 1905
 Artibeus aztecus K. Andersen 1906
 Artibeus hirsutus K. Andersen 1906
 Nycteris aurita (K. Andersen 1912)
 Nycteris gambiensis (K. Andersen 1912)
 Nycteris major" (K. Andersen 1912)
 Nycteris nana (K. Andersen 1912)
 Nycteris tragata (K. Andersen 1912)
 Nycteris woodi K. Andersen 1914
 Mormopterus doriae K. Andersen 1907
 Dobsonia crenulata'' K. Andersen 1909

References

1867 births
1910s missing person cases
1918 deaths
Danish zoologists
Fellows of the Zoological Society of London
Missing person cases in England
People from Frederiksberg
Year of death unknown